The 1964 Central Michigan Chippewas football team represented Central Michigan University in the Interstate Intercollegiate Athletic Conference (IIAC) during the 1964 NCAA College Division football season.  In their 14th season under head coach Kenneth Kelly, the Chippewas compiled a 4–5 record (1–3 against IIAC opponents) and were outscored by their opponents by a combined total of 148 to 117.

The team's statistical leaders included quarterback Pat Boyd with 607 passing yards, halfback Bruce Wyman with 823 rushing yards, and halfback Jamie Gent with 422 receiving yards. Wyman received the team's most valuable player award. Four Central Michigan players (Gent, Wyman, offensive guard Ken Bickel, and linebacker Frank Goldberg) received first-team honors on the All-IIAC team.

Al Thomas was the backfield coach, and Jerry Sieracki was the line coach. Dr. C. F. Anderson was the team physician. Daniel P. Rose was the athletic director.

Schedule

References

Central Michigan
Central Michigan Chippewas football seasons
Central Michigan Chippewas football